The Sequani were a Gallic tribe dwelling in the upper river basin of the Arar river (Saône), the valley of the Doubs and the Jura Mountains during the Iron Age and the Roman period.

Name 
They are mentioned as Sequanos by Caesar (mid-1st c. BC) and Ammianus Marcellinus (4th c. AD), Sequanis by Livy (late 1st c. BC), Sēkoanoús (Σηκοανούς) by Strabo (early 1st c. AD), and as Sequani by Pliny (1st c. AD).

The Gaulish ethnonym Sequani (sing. Sequanos) stems from the Celtic name of the Seine river, Sequana. This may indicate that their original homeland was located by the Seine.

Geography
The country of the Sequani corresponded to Franche-Comté and part of Burgundy. The Jura Mountains separated the Sequani from the Helvetii on the east, but the mountains belonged to the Sequani, as the narrow pass between the Rhone and Lake Geneva was Sequanian. They did not occupy the confluence of the Saône into the Rhone, as the Helvetii plundered the lands of the Aedui there. Extending a line westward from the Jura estimates the southern border at about Mâcon, but Mâcon belonged to the Aedui. Strabo says that the Arar separates the Sequani from the Aedui and the Lingones, which means that the Sequani were on the left, or eastern, bank of the Saône only. On the northeast corner the country of the Sequani touched on the Rhine.

History

Before the arrival of Julius Caesar in Gaul, the Sequani had taken the side of the Arverni against their rivals the Aedui and hired the Suebi under Ariovistus to cross the Rhine and help them (71 BCE). Although his assistance enabled them to defeat the Aedui, the Sequani were worse off than before, for Ariovistus deprived them of a third of their territory and threatened to take another third, while subjugating them into semi-slavery.

The Sequani then appealed to Caesar, who drove back the Germanic tribesmen (58 BCE), but at the same time obliged the Sequani to surrender all that they had gained from the Aedui. This so exasperated the Sequani that they joined in the revolt of Vercingetorix (52 BCE) and shared in the defeat at Alesia. Under Augustus, the district known as Sequania formed part of Belgica. After the death of Vitellius (69 CE), the inhabitants refused to join the Gallic revolt against Rome instigated by Gaius Julius Civilis and Julius Sabinus, and drove back Sabinus, who had invaded their territory. A triumphal arch at Vesontio (Besançon), which in return for this service was made a colony, possibly commemorates this victory.

Diocletian added Helvetia, and part of Germania Superior to Sequania, which was now called Provincia Maxima Sequanorum, Vesontio receiving the title of Metropolis civitas Vesontiensium. The southern reach of this territory was known as Sapaudia, which later developed into Savoy. Fifty years later, Gaul was overrun by the barbarians, and Vesontio sacked (355 CE). Under Julian, it recovered some of its importance as a fortified town, and was able to withstand the attacks of the Vandals. Later, when Rome was no longer able to afford protection to the inhabitants of Gaul, the Sequani became merged in the newly formed Kingdom of Burgundy.

Major settlements
 Vesontio (Besançon)
 Luxovium (Luxeuil-les-Bains)
 Loposagium (Luxiol)
 Portus Abucini (Port-sur-Saône)
 Segobudium (Seveux)
 Epamanduodurum (Mandeure)
 Ariolica (Pontarlier)
 Magetobria / Admagetobria (Broye-lès-Pesmes)
 Pons Dubis (Pontoux)
 Castro Vesulio (Vesoul)

References

Bibliography

Primary sources

Further reading 

 
 T. Rice Holmes, Caesar's Conquest of Gaul (1899), p. 483
 A. Holder, Altceltischer Sprachschatz, ii. (1904).
 Mommsen, Hist. of Rome (Eng. trans.), bk. v. ch. vii.
 Dunod de Charnage, Hist. des Séquanois (1735)
 J. D. Schöpflin, Alsatia illustrata, i. (1751; French trans. by L. W. Ravenèz, 1849).

 
Historical Celtic peoples
Gauls
Auxilia palatina
Tribes involved in the Gallic Wars
Praetorian prefecture of Gaul